Chökyi Nyima Rinpoche (Tibetan: ཆོས་ཀྱི་ཉི་མ་རིན་པོ་ཆེ་, Wyl. chos kyi nyi ma rin po che or ) (b. 1951) is a Tibetan Buddhist teacher and meditation master. He is the abbot of Ka-Nying Shedrub Ling Monastery in Kathmandu, Nepal. He is the author of several books, founder of meditation centers around the world, and an international teacher.

Life
Born in 1951 in Nakchukha, Chökyi Nyima Rinpoche is the eldest son of Kunsang Dechen, a devoted Buddhist practitioner, and Tulku Urgyen Rinpoche, who was considered one of the greatest Dzogchen masters of our time. When he was 18 months old, Chökyi Nyima was recognized as the seventh incarnation Tibetan meditation master Gar Drubchen from Drikung Kagyu lineage. Not long after being recognized as tulku, he was enthroned at Drong Gon Tubten Dargye Ling, in Nakchukha, north of the capital city Lhasa. 

Chökyi Nyima and his family fled Tibet due to the Chinese invasion. He and his younger brother, Tsikey Chokling Rinpoche, soon enrolled at the Young Lamas Home School in Dalhousie, India. At age thirteen, he entered Rumtek Monastery and spent 11 years studying under the care of the 16th Gyalwang Karmapa. In his youth he studied the Karma Kagyu, Drikung Kagyu, and Nyingma traditions. He also studied under Dilgo Khyentse Rinpoche, Dudjom Rinpoche, Khunu Lama Tenzin Gyaltsen, and his father, Kyabje Tulku Urgyen Rinpoche.

Chökyi Nyima Rinpoche left Rumtek in 1974. Upon completion of the monastery in 1976, the Karmapa enthroned Chokyi Nyima Rinpoche as the abbott of Ka-Nying Shedrub Ling Monastery in Kathmandu, Nepal. To this day the monastery is the center of Chökyi Nyima Rinpoche's activities and his main place of residence.

Projects and centers 

Chokyi Nyima Rinpoche is the founder and spiritual head of numerous centers for Buddhist study and meditation in Asia, Europe, and North America.

In Nepal 
Ka-Nying Shedrub Ling Monastery at Boudhanath - a study and practice center for Tibetan Buddhism.

Bibliography

References

External links

1951 births
Living people
20th-century lamas
21st-century lamas
Buddhist monks from Tibet
Dzogchen lamas
Karma Kagyu lamas
Karma Kagyu tulkus
Lamas from Tibet
Nyingma lamas
Nyingma tulkus
Tibetan Buddhists from Nepal
Tulkus